Třebíč is a town in the Vysočina Region of the Czech Republic. It has about 34,000 inhabitants.

The beginnings of the town's history are connected with the establishment of a Benedictine monastery, where the castle is located today. In the age of its expansion, Třebíč was the third most important town in Moravia. The population growth started after World War II.

There are several well-known tourist sights in the town. The Jewish Quarter and St. Procopius Basilica were listed as a UNESCO World Heritage Site in 2003 because of their testimony to cultural interchange across several centuries and the remarkable architecture within the site. The town centre is well preserved and is protected by law as an urban monument zone.

Administrative parts

The town is made up of 17 town parts and villages:

Borovina
Budíkovice
Horka Domky
Jejkov
Nové Dvory
Nové Město
Pocoucov
Podklášteří
Ptáčov
Račerovice
Řípov
Slavice
Sokolí
Stařečka
Týn
Vnitřní Město
Zámostí

Geography
It lies in the Jevišovice Uplands within the Bohemian-Moravian Highlands. The town is located the Jihlava River.

The area is rich in water bodies, including many fish ponds and Lubí Reservoir. The northeastern part of the municipal territory is protected as the Třebíčsko Nature Park.

History

The first written mention of Třebíč is from 1101, when a Benedictine monastery was established here. In 1277, Třebíč was first referred to as a town. In 1335, Třebíč obtained town rights at the level of the rights of royal towns. Třebíč had right to built town fortifications and ceased to be subject unconditionally to the monastery. The Jewish population was first documented in 1338.

During the Hussite Wars, Třebíč was conquered by the Hussites and became their military base. After the wars, the town was returned to the possession of the monastery. In 1468, Třebíč was conquered and destroyed by Matthias Corvinus, including the monastery. After the Bohemian–Hungarian War (1468–1478), Třebíč was acquired by Zdeněk of Sternberg. During the rule of the Pernštejn family between 1490 and 1556, the town recovered and stabilized economically.

Třebíč was not too affected by the Thirty Years' War. After the war, the town was re-Catholicized. In the 17th an 18th centuries, Třebíč was mostly owned by the Waldstein family. In 1786, the Germanisation began. In 1821 and 1822, large fires severely damaged the town.

In the late 19th century, Třebíč was industrialised. There has been mainly development of tannery and shoemaking. The development of industry was accelerated by the opening of the railway in 1886. In the 1930s, the shoe factory was bought by Bata Corporation and workers' colonies were constructed in Borovina.

In the 1970s and 1980s, several historic buildings were demolished and new housing estates were constructed, which resulted in population growth.

Demographics

Transport

Třebíč is an important traffic junction of the region. The main roads crossing Třebíč are I/23 (Brno – České Budějovice) and II/360, which connects Třebíč with the D1 motorway. Road II/405, passing near the town, connects Třebíč with Jihlava.

The railway has the east–west direction in Třebíč. This railway No. 240 connects Třebíč with cities of Brno and Jihlava. There are two train stations serving the town: Třebíč and Třebíč-Borovina.

There is a small sport airport in the outskirts.

Culture
Festivals held in Třebíš include:
Theatre Třebíč (Divadelní Třebíč) – festival of amateur theatre
Šamajim – festival of Jewish culture
Třebíč potato festival (Bramborobraní) – folklore festival – music and dance
UNESCO Jubilee – jubilee celebration of town entrance to the UNESCO list
Theatre 2-3-4 actors (Divadla 2-3-4 herců) – festival of professional theatre
Zámostí – cultural and music festival
Concentus Moraviae – concerts of classical music

Education
In Třebíč there is one private university, Westmoravian College Třebíč. Secondary schools include:
Gymnasium Třebíč
Secondary Industrial School Třebíč
Catholic Gymnasium Třebíč
Dr. Albín Bráf Business Academy
Higher Vocational School and Secondary School of Veterinary, Agricultural and Medical Třebíč
Hotel School Třebíč
Secondary School of Civil Engineering Třebíč
Secondary School of Crafts Třebíč
Private Secondary School and Secondary Vocational School

Sights

The historical treasury of Třebíč includes the old Jewish Quarter and the large Romanesque St. Procopius Basilica, which incorporates some later Gothic features, including a rare example of a ten-part (also known as 'botanical') rose window. Such designs reflect the five or ten parts of the family Rosaceae flowers and fruit, based on their five sepals and petals or the usual ten segments of their fruit. Botanical rose windows contrast with more complex Gothic windows that contain more segments (usually multiples of traditional gothic units of design – three trefoil, or four quatrefoil). Another thesis says that these decorations are based on an ancient design, inspired by forerunners in the wheel of life, associated with eastern religions nowadays, or may allude to the Virgin Mary.

The famous Basilica originated in the early 12th century as a Benedictine monastery. It was endowed so well, that it led to the establishment of a local commercial centre; the town of Třebíč. The monastery was rebuilt during the reign of King Wenceslaus I (1230–53), and again at the end of the 15th century. During the first half of the 16th century some of Třebíč's historic monastic buildings were remodeled into a castle, and were later renovated in Baroque style. In the early 18th century changes were introduced on the basilica by the Czech architect František Maxmilián Kaňka; windows were enlarged, buttresses were added, a southwest tower was rebuilt, and a new west front with two towers was constructed in the gothic baroque style.

The historic centre of Třebíč, which extends on both sides of the river Jihlava, was declared an urban monument zone in 1990. The Jewish Quarter and St. Procopius Basilica, together with the castle and gardens, are all included within the urban monument zone.

Notable people

Johann Philipp Neumann (1774–1849), Austrian physicist and poet
Adolf Kurrein (1846–1919), Austrian rabbi
Friedrich Leo von Rottenberger (1872–1938), Austrian landscape architect
Bohumír Šmeral (1880–1941), politician
Jan Syrový (1888–1970), general and prime minister (1938)
Antonín Kalina (1902–1990), war hero
Jindřich Svoboda (1917–1942), bomber captain in the RAF
Helena Kružíková (1928–2021), actress
Míla Myslíková (1933–2005), actress
Jaroslav Zvěřina (born 1942), politician
František Bublan (born 1951), politician
Miroslav Donutil (born 1951), actor
Oldřich Navrátil (born 1952), actor
Věra Jourová (born 1964), politician and lawyer
Pavel Padrnos (born 1970), road racing cyclist
Jiří Zimola (born 1971), politician
Patrik Eliáš (born 1976), ice hockey player
Martin Erat (born 1981), ice hockey player
Ondřej Němec (born 1984), ice hockey player
Theodor Gebre Selassie (born 1986), footballer
Vladimír Sobotka (born 1987), ice hockey player
Jitka Válková (born 1991), Czech Miss winner
Karel Vejmelka (born 1996), ice hockey player

Twin towns – sister cities

Třebíč is twinned with:
 Humenné, Slovakia
 Lilienfeld, Austria
 Oschatz, Germany
 Rakhiv, Ukraine
 Yichang, China

Gallery

References

External links

UNESCO Heritage in Třebíč
Official website of the castle
Photos of Třebíč and Background Information

 
Populated places in Třebíč District
Cities and towns in the Czech Republic
Shtetls
World Heritage Sites in the Czech Republic